I Remember You..., is an album by vocalist Karin Krog with saxophonist Warne Marsh and bassist Red Mitchell recorded in 1980 and released on the Spotlite label.

Reception 

The Allmusic review states "The play list includes both jazz and pop standards. More to the point, regardless of the nature of the tunes, these three reconstruct them with a modern jazz feel. ... I Remember You is another memorable chapter in the artistic life of a consummate jazz performer and is recommended".

Track listing 
 "I Remember You" (Victor Schertzinger, Johnny Mercer) – 5:37
 "Trane" (Tadd Dameron, Karin Krog) – 7:20
 "Lester's Happy" (Lester Young, King Pleasure) – 3:05
 "Moody's Mood for Love (James Moody, Eddie Jefferson) – 4:47
 "It's You or No One" ( Jule Styne, Sammy Cahn) – 5:00
 "Lover Man" (Jimmy Davis, Ram Ramirez, Jimmy Sherman) – 7:22
 "Speak Low" (Kurt Weill, Ogden Nash) – 5:38
 "That Old Feeling" (Sammy Fain, Lew Brown) – 6:11
 "It's You or No One" [Alternate Take] (Styne, Cahn) – 5:08 Bonus track on CD reissue
 "Speak Low" [Alternate Take] (Weill, Nash) – 5:49 Bonus track on CD reissue
 "That Old Feeling" [Alternate Take] (Fain, Brown) – 6:09 Bonus track on CD reissue

Personnel 
Karin Krog – vocals
Warne Marsh – tenor saxophone
Red Mitchell – bass

References 

Warne Marsh albums
Karin Krog albums
1980 albums
Spotlite Records albums